Elections to Magherafelt District Council were held on 15 May 1985 on the same day as the other Northern Irish local government elections. The election used three district electoral areas to elect a total of 15 councillors.

Election results

Note: "Votes" are the first preference votes.

Districts summary

|- class="unsortable" align="centre"
!rowspan=2 align="left"|Ward
! % 
!Cllrs
! % 
!Cllrs
! %
!Cllrs
! %
!Cllrs
! % 
!Cllrs
!rowspan=2|TotalCllrs
|- class="unsortable" align="center"
!colspan=2 bgcolor="" | SDLP
!colspan=2 bgcolor="" | Sinn Féin
!colspan=2 bgcolor="" | DUP
!colspan=2 bgcolor="" | UUP
!colspan=2 bgcolor="white"| Others
|-
|align="left"|Magherafelt Town
|23.1
|1
|20.4
|1
|bgcolor="#D46A4C"|34.5
|bgcolor="#D46A4C"|2
|18.6
|1
|3.4
|0
|5
|-
|align="left"|Moyola
|21.0
|1
|bgcolor="#008800"|28.4
|bgcolor="#008800"|1
|26.3
|2
|24.3
|1
|0.0
|0
|5
|-
|align="left"|Sperrin
|bgcolor="#99FF66"|40.6
|bgcolor="#99FF66"|2
|29.5
|2
|10.7
|0
|15.3
|1
|3.9
|0
|5
|- class="unsortable" class="sortbottom" style="background:#C9C9C9"
|align="left"| Total
|28.2
|4
|26.0
|4
|24.0
|4
|19.3
|3
|2.5
|0
|15
|-
|}

District results

Magherafelt Town

1985: 2 x DUP, 1 x SDLP, 1 x UUP, 1 x Sinn Féin

Moyola

1985: 2 x DUP, 1 x Sinn Féin, 1 x UUP, 1 x SDLP

Sperrin

1985: 2 x SDLP, 2 x Sinn Féin, 1 x UUP

References

Magherafelt District Council elections
Magherafelt